Patrick Aloysius Maloney (5 March 1894 – 11 February 1955) was an Australian rules footballer who played with St Kilda in the Victorian Football League (VFL).

Notes

External links 

1894 births
1955 deaths
Australian rules footballers from Victoria (Australia)
St Kilda Football Club players